Shahrak-e Parvaz (also Romanized as Shahrak-e Parvāz) is a village in Salakh Rural District, Shahab District, Qeshm County, Hormozgan Province, Iran. At the 2006 census, its population was 105, in 33 families.

References 

Populated places in Qeshm County